This is the list of cathedrals in Montenegro sorted by denomination.

Serbian Orthodox
Cathedrals of the Serbian Orthodox Church:
 Cathedral of the Resurrection of Christ in Podgorica
 Cathedral of St. Basil of Ostrog in Nikšić

Roman Catholic 
Cathedrals of the Roman Catholic Church in Montenegro:
 Cathedral of the Immaculate Conception in Bar
 Cathedral of St. Tryphon in Kotor

See also

Lists of cathedrals by country

References

Cathedrals
Cathedrals
Montenegro